Hans-Joachim Klein (born 20 August 1942) is a retired West German freestyle swimmer. He competed in various freestyle sprint events at the 1960 and 1964 Olympics and won three silver and one bronze medals in 1964. In 1965 he was elected as German Sportspersonality of the Year.

In 1962–1963 Klein studied industrial engineering at the University of Southern California. He later defended a PhD in Germany and went into politics and administration. In 1969–1985 he worked at the Hessian Economic and Traffic Ministry, between 1985 and 1997 was a Darmstadt District Administrator, and from 1997 until his retirement in 2008 was the manager of the Supply and Transport Company of Leipzig. In addition, in 2001–2007 he acted as president of the German Olympic Society.

See also 
 World record progression 200 metres freestyle

References 

1942 births
Living people
Sportspeople from Darmstadt
German male swimmers
Olympic swimmers of the United Team of Germany
Olympic silver medalists for the United Team of Germany
Olympic bronze medalists for the United Team of Germany
Olympic bronze medalists in swimming
Medalists at the 1964 Summer Olympics
Swimmers at the 1960 Summer Olympics
Swimmers at the 1964 Summer Olympics
Olympic silver medalists in swimming
Universiade medalists in swimming
Universiade gold medalists for West Germany
Universiade bronze medalists for West Germany
Medalists at the 1963 Summer Universiade
Medalists at the 1965 Summer Universiade